Lu Xueshan (September 21, 1905 – May 20, 1981) was a Chinese physicist, who was a member of the Chinese Academy of Sciences.

References 

1905 births
1981 deaths
Members of the Chinese Academy of Sciences